Oncis mortoni is a species of air-breathing sea slug, a shell-less marine pulmonate gastropod mollusk in the family Onchidiidae.

Description

Distribution
Oncis mortoni is seen in shores of Hong Kong。

References

 Dayrat, B. (2009) Review of the current knowledge of the systematics of Onchidiidae (Mollusca: Gastropoda: Pulmonata) with a checklist of nominal species. Zootaxa 2068: 1–26

External links

Onchidiidae
Gastropods described in 1984